The preliminary round of the 2021 Africa Cup of Nations qualification tournament decided four teams which advanced to the group stage of the qualification tournament. The preliminary round consisted of the eight lowest-ranked teams among the 52 entrants: Liberia, Mauritius, Gambia, South Sudan, Chad, São Tomé and Príncipe, Seychelles, and Djibouti.

The eight teams were drawn into four ties and played in home-and-away two-legged format. The four winners advanced to the group stage to join the 44 teams which entered directly.

The first legs were played on 9 October, and the second legs were played on 13 October 2019.

Matches

|}

1–1 on aggregate. Chad won 5–4 on penalties and advanced to qualification Group A.

South Sudan won 3–1 on aggregate and advanced to qualification Group B.

São Tomé and Príncipe won 5–2 on aggregate and advanced to qualification Group C.

2–2 on aggregate. Gambia won 3–2 on penalties and advanced to qualification Group D.

Goalscorers

Notes

References

Preliminary round